George R. Poulos (1927-September 28, 2014) was a Michigan politician.

Biography 
Poulos was born in 1932 and lived in Flint until the day he died. He work at the Bell/Ameritech Yellow Pages. He had at least one daughter. 

The Flint City Commission selected Poulos as mayor for the years 1962-1964. he also served on the Genesee County Board of Supervisors.

Since 1989, he volunteered at Bay Cliff Health Camp, a year-round, nonprofit therapy and wellness center for persons with physical disabilities. He died September 28, 2014.

References

Mayors of Flint, Michigan
20th-century American politicians